William Thwaites (1853–1907) was a civil engineer working in Melbourne, Australia in the late nineteenth and early twentieth centuries. He was responsible for the design and supervision of construction of Melbourne's sewerage system.

Early life and training
Thwaites was born in Melbourne, Australia on 13 August 1853 to cabinet maker Thomas Henry Thwaites (1826-1912), the second son of George Thwaites Senior (1791-1865) and Eliza Thwaites née Raven (1831-1907), who were married in 1851.

Thwaites was educated at the Model School in Spring Street in the 1860s. His family moved in about 1858 to 64 Little Collins Street East. Thwaites trained under the famous engineer William Charles Kernot, obtaining the certificate of Civil Engineering and Master of Arts (1876 at the University of Melbourne). He was recipient of the Argus Scholarship, which had been advocated by Kernot and Frederick McCoy in 1873 and in 1875 he was awarded the Natural Science Scholarship at the University of Melbourne. This, as part of a total of £330 in scholarships and exhibition prizes, helped greatly to fund his education, otherwise unobtainable through his family's limited means. Under an agreement between Melbourne University and the Victorian government, Thwaites undertook 12 months experience under supervision of an engineer, Arthur Wells, as pupil draftsman in the railway department.

Career
Thwaites was given a permanent position with the Victorian Railways when he completed this apprenticeship in 1876, and moved to work on the Portland-Hamilton, Oakleigh-Bunyip then the Ararat-Stawell railway line, but lack of further Victorian railway work saw his shift to the South Australian Railways, where he commenced surveying for the Port Augusta and Government Gums Railway, the first stage in a projected Central Australia Railway line to Darwin. Following this he moved on to the Port Wakefield and Kadina railway, although he was subsequently without work during 1878 and returned to Melbourne, where he joined the Harbour Branch of the Victorian Public Works Department (PWD) in 1879 to survey the Portland Harbour, Gippsland Lakes entrance and Sale navigation canal, as part of preparatory plans for their development under John Coode's designs. Thwaites also undertook a survey of Swan Island for defence purposes in 1879.

In 1880 Thwaites shifted to the Water Supply Department, surveying for the Broken Creek improvement, and then under the renamed Melbourne Water Supply Branch of the PWD worked under mentorship of William Davidson. From 1881 he was surveying Bruce's Creek diversion and prepared drawings for the Yan Yean clearwater channel, Toorourrong Reservoir when he discovered Wallaby and Silver creeks and demonstrated their suitability for diversion of water to Yan Yean at a time of serious water storage. he then surveyed the Wallaby and Silver creek aqueducts. Thwaites also designed schemes of service reservoirs to serve the expanding suburbs, including those at Essendon, Caulfield and Preston. However, a major failure in this period was the cracking of the new water main over Merri Creek on the Yan Yean supply, which was shown by WC Kernot to have been caused by errors in Thwaites' and Davidson's design.

In 1883 Thwaites was appointed Engineer, Roads, Bridges and Drainage in the PWD, and undertook a series of swamp reclamation schemes including the Port Melbourne Lagoon (1885), West Melbourne Swamp, Moonee Ponds Creek, Koo-Wee-Rup Swamp (1890), the Moe River and Lake Condah although the last was completed by Carlo Catani. In 1889 Thwaites also designed the system for pumping water from Dight's Falls on the Yarra River, to the Botanic Gardens. Thwaites was made engineer in charge of the water supply branch in 1890, and engineer-in-chief of the Melbourne and Metropolitan Board of Works in 1891.

Professional roles
Thwaites was made a member of the Victorian Institute of Engineers in 1881 (president in 1892), and became a councillor of the Institute of Surveyors in 1887, was a member of the Institution of Civil Engineers, London, 1889, and was the Australasian representative on the ICE council from 1899 to 1901. He was made co-examiner in engineering at the University of Melbourne and held a position on the University Council from 1890, including the subcommittee which set the course of mathematics in Engineering Degrees, continuing into the 20th century when Kernot was waning. He was known to have 'had a genius for statistics', especially of the climate and geography of the metropolitan area and owned among the best engineering libraries in Victoria.

Melbourne sewerage system
Thwaites' greatest achievement was in the design and supervision of the construction of Melbourne's underground sewerage scheme, which was at the time the largest civil engineering project in the history of Victoria. He initially gave evidence to the Royal Commission into the Sanitary Conditions of Melbourne in 1889 at which he produced a detailed and comprehensive scheme for underground sewers for Melbourne. While British engineer James Mansergh was brought to Australia to advise on the Sewerage System and proposed a number of design options, a 2011 biography by Robert La Nauze has demonstrated that Mansergh drew strongly from Thwaites' earlier report, and it was left to Thwaites, when appointed to the task, to put the plans into practice and he successfully argued for a modification of Mansergh's proposals by reducing the size of the main sewer pipes and so "...removed a design fault in Mansergh’s scheme that would have led to embarrassing blockages". The large main sewers proposed by Mansergh would not have created sufficient velocity to scour the solids, particularly in the early stages before many properties were connected, and so Thwaites believed they would require manual cleaning. His solution was to reduce the diameter of the mains, and use ovoid section sewers, which had a narrow section at the base that concentrated the flow and therefore increased the velocity. Other changes were the construction of a single pumping station at Spotswood and a single sewage treatment farm at Werribee.

Construction began on the sewers in 1892 and the first house connections were made from 1897.  Thwaites reported to the 1896 and 1900 parliamentary committees of inquiry on progress of the sewerage works and addressed a variety of complaints both personally and in detailed reports.

Illness and death
After being "seized with illness", Thwaites died in San Remo on 19 November 1907, from uraemia and pneumonia. At the time, his massive sewerage project was nearing completion. After being mourned with a funeral procession more than a mile long, he was buried in Melbourne General Cemetery.

Personal life
Thwaites was married twice, first to Elizabeth Ferres (1855–1905) on 18 October 1877, and again on 16 December 1905 to Margaret Barton, who survived him. No children were born to either marriage, but he and Elizabeth adopted a daughter, Elsie May, in 1886.

See also
Water supply and sanitation in Australia

References
 Melbourne and Metropolitan Board of Works Sewerage Scheme MMBW, (Melb, 1900)
 Building and Engineering Journal, 25 July 1891

1853 births
1907 deaths
Australian civil engineers
Water management in Victoria (Australia)
19th-century Australian public servants